(born January 6, 1989) is a Japanese former professional boxer who competed from 2006 to 2015. He is a two-weight world champion, having held the WBA flyweight title from 2010 to 2011, and the IBF super-flyweight title from 2013 to 2014. His brothers, Kōki and Tomoki, are also professional boxers.

Professional career

Personal life and early career
Daiki is one of the three Kameda brothers, the other two are the former WBA (Regular) Bantamweight Champion, Kōki, and the former WBO Bantamweight Champion, Tomoki.

Nicknamed Naniwa no Benkei (Benkei of Osaka) by his father, Shirō, he made his professional debut on February 26, 2006. "You must never fall down, until I decide to throw in a towel or a referee calls a stop," Shirō said to him. "Fight like Benkei who died while standing up."

In his early career, he had made it his custom to sing a song for the audience after each of his victories.

Controversy
Kameda lost to Daisuke Naito, then the WBC flyweight champion, in Naito's first title defense on October 11, 2007. Despite making comments before the match that he would commit seppuku if he lost, his manager later confirmed that he would not. His boxer's license was suspended by the Japan Boxing Commission for one year due to professional misconduct during the match.

Kameda resorted to elbowing and Professional wrestling bodyslams out of frustration during his bout with Naito because he was behind on points and the crowd was against him from the beginning.

Up until this point Kameda's father who was his chief second, has said that he will not seek to have his seconds license reinstated after being suspended indefinitely for his role in the controversy and that he will step down as a trainer altogether. Fans and analysts are divided on whether or not Shiro Kameda will return to training regardless of the statements he has made in the press. However, some believe that he is sincere so as to prevent any further controversy surrounding his sons' future fights.

After winning the WBA World Flyweight Title in a rematch against Denkaosan Kaovichit in Kobe in 2010, he relinquished his title in January 2011, in order to move up to the Junior Bantamweight division. Kameda would be successful in his second weight class by winning the vacant IBF Super flyweight title against Mexican boxer Rodrigo Guerrero.

Professional boxing record

See also
List of flyweight boxing champions
List of super-flyweight boxing champions
List of Japanese boxing world champions
Notable boxing families

References

External links

Official Website (Japanese)

1989 births
Living people
Sportspeople from Osaka
Japanese male boxers
Flyweight boxers
Super-flyweight boxers
World flyweight boxing champions
World super-flyweight boxing champions
World Boxing Association champions
International Boxing Federation champions
20th-century Japanese people
21st-century Japanese people